Goran Ješić (born 3 August 1974 in Sremska Mitrovica, SFR Yugoslavia) is a Vice President in the Democratic Party in Serbia and was the Vice President of the Government of Vojvodina from 2012 to 2014.

References

External links 
Official WebSite

1974 births
Living people
People from Sremska Mitrovica
Democratic Party (Serbia) politicians
Government ministers of Vojvodina
Members of the National Assembly (Serbia)